The 2022–23 Fencing World Cup is the 52nd edition of the Fencing World Cup, a fencing competition organized annually by the International Fencing Federation. It began on 10 November 2022 in Algiers and ends in July 2023 at the end of the World Championships. The official calendar includes eight competitions (five category A tournaments and three Grand Prix) per discipline (epee, foil and sabre), in addition to the zone and world championships.

Point distribution

Individual 
The competitions on the calendar are divided into five categories. All earn points counting for the world cup according to a pre-established coefficient: coefficient 1 for the world cup events and zone championships, coefficient 1.5 for the grand prix, coefficient 2.5 for the world championships and coefficient 3 for the Olympic Games. Satellite tournaments, intended to familiarize young fencers with international competitions, earn few points.

To calculate a fencer's ranking, only the five best point totals obtained during World Cup, Grand Prix or satellite events, as well as World and Zone Championships and Olympic Games count.

Team 
The point distribution is the same for all team competitions, except for the World Championships which earn double.

To calculate the ranking of a team, only the four best results of the World Cup events, as well as those of the World Championships or Olympic Games and the results of the zone championships count.

Calendar

Women

Main circuit

Men

Main circuit

Overall rankings

Épée

Women

Men

Foil

Women

Men

Sabre

Women

Men

Statistics 
Overall men's and women's medal tables for World Cup and Grand Prix events, excluding satellites and major championships.

Women

Men

See also 
Fencing at the 2024 Summer Olympics – Qualification

Notes

References

External links 
 FIE official website

2022 in fencing
2023 in fencing
Fencing World Cup
Fencing